Josef "Seppi" Rottmoser (born 7 February 1990) is a German ski mountaineer.

Rottmoser was born in Rosenheim. He started ski mountaineering in 2000, and competed first in 2007.

Selected results 
 2010:
 9th ("ISMF men" ranking), Patrouille des Glaciers, together with Konrad Lex and Martin Echtler
 2012:
 1st, European Championship, sprint
 5th, European Championship, relay, together with Philipp Reiter, Anton Palzer and Alexander Schuster
 9th, European Championship, combination ranking
 1st, Hochgrat ski rallye
 2013:
 1st, World Championship, sprint

External links 
 Seppi Rottmoser, skimountaineering.org
 Josef Rottmoser, skimountaineering.org

References 

1990 births
Living people
German male ski mountaineers
People from Rosenheim
Sportspeople from Upper Bavaria
21st-century German people